The second season of One-Punch Man anime series is animated by J.C. Staff, with Chikara Sakurai replacing Shingo Natsume as director and Yoshikazu Iwanami replacing Shoji Hata as sound director. Tomohiro Suzuki, Chikashi Kubota and Makoto Miyazaki reprised their roles as series composer, character designer and music composer, respectively. The second season aired between April 9 and July 2, 2019, while a television special recapping the first season aired on April 2, 2019. The second season is simulcast on Hulu in the United States, on Tubi in Canada, on AnimeLab in Australia and New Zealand, and on Crunchyroll in Europe.


Episode list

Notes

References

One-Punch Man episode lists
2019 Japanese television seasons